Aquidabã, anglicized to Aquidaban, was a Brazilian ironclad battleship built in the mid-1880s. The ship participated in two naval revolts; during the second she was sunk by a government torpedo boat. After being refloated, Aquidabã was sent to (Germany) for repairs and modernization. During a routine cruise in 1906, the ship's ammunition magazines exploded, which caused the vessel to sink rapidly with a great loss of life.

Design

The ship displaced  and had a crew of 277 officers and enlisted men.

Aquidabãs main armament consisted of four  guns mounted in two twin gun turrets, each of which was placed off the centerline, en echelon, with the forward turret offset to port and the aft turret to starboard. Secondary weapons included four  guns, two fore and two aft, and thirteen 1-pounder guns, all on single mounts. The ship was also equipped with five  torpedo tubes; three were above water, while the remaining two were below the waterline. The ship was equipped with compound armor. This included the propulsion machinery spaces and ammunition magazines. The main-battery turrets were protected with  worth of armor, as was the conning tower.

Construction and career

Aquidabã was built in England by Samuda Brothers for £345,000 pounds sterling; her keel was laid on 18 June 1883, and she was launched on 17 January 1885. The ship was a slightly smaller version of the earlier battleship , being shorter, having a lighter draft, and being equipped with only one funnel. After undergoing gunnery trials on 14 August, she sailed from England on 16 December, calling upon Lisbon and Bahia before reaching her ultimate destination of Rio de Janeiro on 29 January 1886.

Rebellions

Aquidabã was part of a rebellion which started on 23 November 1891, headed by Rear Admiral Custódio José de Melo. Two years later (1893), she voyaged to the United States to take part in the International Naval Review. In that same year, she was the flagship of the Revolta da Armada (Revolt of the Navy), once again led by de Melo. On 16 April 1894, Aquidabã was anchored off the coast of Santa Catarina, near the Fortress of Anhatomirim. Early in the morning, the first class torpedo boat , accompanied by three other torpedo boats, attacked Aquidabã; two torpedoes connected with the battleship and she sank in shallow water, inflicting only light damage in return.

The battle, which marked the first use of torpedoes by the Brazilian military, signaled the end of the revolution in Brazil. The members of the revolutionary government based in Desterro, in the island of Santa Catarina, fled to the continent; loyalist Colonel Antônio Moreira César would later regain control of the city. Refloated in June 1894 by government forces, Aquidabã was quickly renamed to first Dezesseis de Abril (English: 16 April), then Vinte e Quatro de Maio (English: 24 May) due to anger over the ship rebelling twice in four years. Partially repaired, the ship was brought to Stettin, Germany, and Elswick, England for a full repair and refitting. The work lasted from 1897 to 1898, and included the installation of two heavy fighting masts.

Later career

In 1900 she was renamed again, this time to restore her original name. In 1904, the ship underwent further modernization at the island of Ilha das Cobras (English: Snakes Island), near Rio de Janeiro. This included the removal of the two heavy masts that had been installed in 1898 and two torpedo tubes. Aquidabã made many cruises in these years to test the new technology of wireless telegraphy and to train midshipmen.

On 21 January 1906, Aquidabã was scheduled to voyage to the port at Jacarepaguá, near Rio de Janeiro, to escort and accommodate the Minister of Marine and his staff, who were attached to the cruiser . They were inspecting sites for use as an arsenal. At about 10:45 pm, when she was moored at Jacuacanga Bay, near Ilha Grande (English: Big Island), the powder magazines blew up, sinking the ship within three minutes. A total of 212 people were killed, including three admirals and most of the officers of the ship, and 36 were injured; 98 survived.

Notes

Footnotes

References

 
 
 

Aquidaban
Maritime incidents in 1906
1885 ships
Shipwrecks in the Atlantic Ocean
Ships sunk by non-combat internal explosions
Ships built in Cubitt Town